Scythris lobella is a moth of the family Scythrididae. It was described by K. Nupponen in 2013. It is found in southern Spain. The habitat consists of xerotermic slopes with sparse vegetation.

Etymology
The species name refers to the lateral lobes of tegumen in the male genitalia and is derived from Latin lobus (meaning lobe).

References

lobella
Moths described in 2013